Futbol Club Andorra is a professional football club based in Andorra la Vella, Andorra, that currently competes in Segunda División, the second tier of the Spanish league system. The club was founded in 1942 and currently plays its home fixtures at Estadi Nacional. In spite of being based in the microstate of Andorra, the club, voluntarily affiliated to the Catalan Football Federation, has been allowed to compete in Spanish leagues since 1948.

History 
Futbol Club Andorra has historically been the biggest football club in the country. The club was founded on 15 October 1942 in the College of Our Lady of Meritxell and was the first football club to be founded in Andorra. The club joined the categories of the Catalan Football Federation, contesting the Spanish League and Spanish Cup. In the 1963–64 season FC Andorra debuted in the Segunda Regional, finishing in the 11th position.

After several years in regional categories, the Andorran club climbed in 1981 to Segunda División B (third level of the Spanish league system), where they remained for 17 years, with a break in the 1986–87 season when the team played in Tercera División. In the 1988–89 and 1989–90 seasons FC Andorra was close to promotion to Segunda División.

The club's greatest success came in 1994 when FC Andorra won the Copa Catalunya. The Andorran team eliminated FC Barcelona in the semi-finals (aggregate 2–1) and defeated RCD Espanyol in the final played in the Municipal Stadium of Vilassar de Mar, winning 4–2 on penalties after no goals were scored during ordinary and extra time.

At the end of the 1997–98 season the team was relegated to Tercera División (fourth tier).

Their best performance to date in the Copa del Rey was in the 1995–96 edition, beating Palamós CF and Getafe CF before being eliminated by Celta Vigo in Round 16.

From 1986 to 2013 the club also had a futsal section (FC Andorra Futsal) that played in División de Honor and División de Plata.

The Andorran club was bought in December 2018 by Gerard Piqué's Kosmos Holding Group, and in April 2019 presented its main sponsor MoraBanc; known as a strong and a benchmark bank in Andorra. Weeks later they achieved promotion to Tercera División, after a streak of 22 matches unbeaten. In July 2019, the club paid a €452,022 fee to replace CF Reus Deportiu in the Segunda División B after Reus were relegated to the Tercera División for failing to pay its players.

On 20 February 2020, head coach Gabri Garcia was fired from the club. The reason was poor results with 3 consecutive losses and 7 matches without a single victory. On the same day Nacho Castro was appointed as the club's new head coach. On 27 February 2020, one of the biggest business groups in Andorra Pyrénées signed an agreement with the club, becoming its "premium partner".

In 2021 the team qualified for the promotion play-offs to Segunda División for the first time; however, the club was eliminated in the first round by Real Sociedad B. Although, despite this result the team achieved a place in the Primera División RFEF, new league of the third level of Spanish football.

On 21 May 2022, the team was promoted to the Segunda División after beating already relegated UCAM Murcia 1–0 at home, thus getting promoted to the second tier for the first time in their history.

Stadium 

FC Andorra historically hosted their matches at the Camp d’Esports de les Valls in the capital city of Andorra la Vella before relocating in 1983, to the Estadi Comunal d'Aixovall which, after a renovation in 1999, had a capacity of 1,000 spectators. Following the closure of Aixovall, the club relocated again in 2015 to the new, smaller Centre d'Entrenament de la FAF facility in Andorra la Vella.

More recently the team have been based at the 500-seat Camp de Fútbol de Prada de Moles in Encamp however, since 2021, the club has utilised the 3,306-capacity Estadi Nacional for all home games following an agreement made with the Government of Andorra. The stadium had previously hosted FC Andorra games on a temporary basis in 2015 prior to the opening of the Centre d'Entrenament de la FAF.

On 8 May 2022, a record 3,631 fans attended the team's home match against visiting Albacete Balompié at Estadi Nacional.

In August 2022, following their promotion to the Segunda División, the club announced future plans for a new 6,000-capacity stadium on the site of the existing Camp de Fútbol de Prada de Moles, with an estimated cost of €26 million.

Crest and shirt 

FC Andorra's traditional crest, first used in 1948, used the colours and icons of the country of Andorra. It represented the coat of arms of Andorra with some minor variations, featuring the arms of both the Bishop of Urgell and Count of Foix - the two historical Co-Princes of Andorra - along with the arms of the Viscounts of Béarn and Catalonia, two neighbouring territories that Andorra has historically been reliant upon. The traditional crest was updated and amended on several occasions though keeping a very similar and familiar appearance. On 7 July 2021, the club announced a change in its brand image, replacing the traditional crest with the current logo featuring a new round crest in blue with a white pattern representing the name of the club, the country and the mountains characterising the nation. In addition, these elements are encircled by the colours of the Andorran flag.

The club first used red shirts and white shorts as its kit, however this was soon changed in 1948 when they adopted the blue, yellow and red colours of the national flag of Andorra. From 2019, the club has partnered with the American sports brand Nike to supply the playing kits for the team.

Honours
Primera Catalana
Champions (1): 2018–19
Copa Catalunya
Winners (2): 1993–94, 2022-23

Seasons 

1 season in Segunda División
1 season in Primera División RFEF
19 seasons in Segunda División B
6 seasons in Tercera División

Players

Current squad

Out on loan

Current technical staff 

   Manu Torres

   Gilbert Morell

See also 

FC Andorra Futsal

References

External links 
Official website
FCF team profile 
BDFútbol profile
Club & stadium history 

 
Association football clubs established in 1942
Expatriated football clubs
1942 establishments in Andorra
Football clubs in Andorra
Sport in Andorra la Vella
Divisiones Regionales de Fútbol clubs
Primera Federación clubs
Segunda División clubs